Alameda's Hot Springs Retreat, commonly called Alameda's is a retreat and conference center in Hot Springs, MT offering lodging, massage and holistic health services and space for group retreats.  It sits on the reservation of the Confederated Salish and Kootenai Tribes of the Flathead Nation, about 65 miles from Kalispell, Montana and 73 miles from Missoula, Montana in  Sanders County, Montana.

Alameda's regularly offers workshops in permaculture and sustainable living, and in music, meditation, and renewable energy. Its two hot water wells provide an ongoing source of the relaxing, lithium-rich mineral waters for which Hot Springs, Montana is noted.

Recent work at Alameda's has focused on developing the geothermal heat potential of its wells as a source for heating greenhouses and growing algae for soil amendments, biofuels, and organic agriculture.

Notes

See also 

Hot Springs, Montana information

External links 
Alameda's Hot Springs Retreat Home Page
Hot Springs Man Sees Energy in All That Water, Article in the Missoulian.

Buildings and structures in Sanders County, Montana
Hot springs of Montana
Tourist attractions in Sanders County, Montana